Top-seed Andrea Jaeger won the final and $27,500 first prize money by defeating second-seeded Virginia Ruzici in the final.

Seeds
The top eight seeds received a bye into the second round. A champion seed is indicated in bold text while text in italics indicates the round in which that seed was eliminated.

  Andrea Jaeger (champion)
  Virginia Ruzici (final)
  Mima Jaušovec (semifinals)
  Regina Maršíková (semifinals)
  Dianne Fromholtz (second round)
  Sue Barker (quarterfinals)
  JoAnne Russell (third round)
  Anne Smith (quarterfinals)
  Mary Lou Piatek (second round)
  Sandy Collins (first round)
  Anne White (second round)
  Kathleen Horvath (second round)
  Pam Casale (third round)
  Kathy Rinaldi (third round)

Draw

Finals

Top half

Section 1

Section 2

Bottom half

Section 3

Section 4

References

External links

U.S. Clay Court Championships
1981 U.S. Clay Court Championships